Lewis E. Hollander Jr. (born June 6, 1930) is a physicist, author and Ironman World Age Group champion triathlete. He is listed in the Guinness Book of World Records for being the oldest to finish the Hawaii Ironman at 82. His record has since been broken by Hiromu Inada, who finished the 2018 edition of the Ironman Hawaii at age 85.

Personal life

Hollander was born in Woodmere, New York. He graduated from Adelphi University in 1951 with a BA degree in physics, and was a graduate student at Case Western Reserve from 1955 to 1957. As a naval officer during the Korean War, he worked in radiological defense including nuclear weapons testing, instrumentation and radiological defense. He is a physicist, specializing in material science and the science of instrumentation and more recently nanotechnology and the processes to produce thin nano dimension layers. From April 1952 to April 1955 he was stationed at The US Naval Radiological Defense Lab, in San Francisco, California. He was involved in atomic radiation standards and measurement. He developed a method of growing cadmium sulfide, CdS crystals and produced an ionizing radiation meter useful in civil defense and published in the American Physical Society Journal, Review of Scientific Instruments. Upon leaving the Navy he was awarded a contract to develop his radiation meter at Victoreen Instruments, based in Cleveland, Ohio. He then went to American Standard, Nuclear Division, located in Mountain View, California, and then as a senior scientist to Lockheed Missiles and Space in Palo Alto, California. There he was the first to observe the large 10,000 to 1 anisotropic conduction in rutile TiO2. His principle research was in piezoresistivity, (effect of stress and strain in single crystals on their conductivity) (4 and 5) He also studied the elastic moduli in Rutile, TiO2 and the dielectric properties of rutile. After that Hollander was Director of the Endeveco Solid State Physics Laboratory, Los Altos, California. He then started his own company and was Sec.Tres.of Integrated Transducers Inc., headquartered in Guynabo, Puerto Rico, which produced his patented piezoresistance phono cartridge used in Motorola's high fidelity audio systems. He has served as president of Green Mansions Inc since 1952. His early work on TiO2 has led him in recent years to the development of, nano layers, two dimensional layers substraited with rutile, TiO2. Awarded 22 US patents and published numerous papers in the American Physical Society journals, Physical Review, Journal of Applied Physics, Journal of the Acoustic Society and Review of Scientific Instruments and several other peer reviewed journals. Hollander is listed in Who's Who in Frontiers of Science and Technology and also Who's Who in Science and Engineering.

He lives and trains with his wife, the former Karen Jones, in Terrebonne, Oregon, USA.  They were married March 10, 2019, in Saint Thomas, Virgin Islands.

Athletic career

Until Hiromu Inada’s finish at the 2018 Ironman Hawaii at age 85, Hollander was the oldest person in the world to finish an Ironman distance race at the age of 84 on November 1, 2014, at Panama City Florida. The Ironman distance is a 2.4-mile swim, a 112-mile bike ride and a 26.2-mile run. Also Hollander was the oldest person to finish the famous Hawaii Ironman World Championship in 2012 at age 82 and he is listed in the Guinness Book of World Records.(1) Hollander was awarded the "Hall of Fame" for the American Endurance Ride Conference, AERC in 1998. Long-distance horse racing, is an international equestrian sport, one horse one rider, 25, 50, 100 and more miles. He is the winner of the 1979 Ochoco 150-mile race. National Res. AERC Champion 1973 4th in 1974 and 8th in 1975 and introduced the slogan "to finish is to win" and the "Vet Gate" both are universally used today by the sport of endurance riding all over the world. He also has run over 100 marathons and many ultra marathons including the prestigious Western States 100 Mile run in one day in 1984 which starts in Lake Tahoe, NV. and ends in Auburn, CA. Hollander is also the oldest person to complete the Ride and Tie World Championship at age 86 held at Aspen Lake, Oregon June 27, 2015, finishing 14th overall. Hollander is also the oldest person, in the 37 years of the race to complete the Escape from Alcatraz Triathlon at age 87. This includes the swim from the famous prison island in San Francisco Bay, California. Hollander has won seven age group world championships. Two at the Hawaii Kona Ironman World Championship and five at the International Triathlon Union, ITU, World Championship Long course, Fredericia, Denmark twice and Sado, Japan, the Olympic Distance ITU world Championship at Vancouver, Canada, and the 2018 sprint duathlon at Odense, Denmark. Hollander was 2013 All American and 2013 and 2014, All World Athlete of the year for Ironman 2014 and Hollander was awarded "performance of the year" by The Ironman World Championship Corp. He is also featured in the BBC (British Broadcasting Co.) documentary "The Human Body Secrets of your Life Revealed, Episode 1, BBC 2017. Can be viewed at www.dailmotion.com.  Hollander was invited by Sheik Nasser bin Hamal Al Khahifa of Bahrain, as his guest, to do the half Ironman race December 5, 2015, and to return to Dubai, UAE for the half ironman in held on January 29, 2016. In 2017 Hollander was awarded Aquabike All American by USA Triathlon.

Works
Endurance Riding from Beginning to Winning. INSB #0-8289-0423-5 Six editions 1989, 1991, 1993, 1996, 2000, 2006 Published by Green Mansions Inc. P O Box 100, Redmond, OR 97756
And Chocolate Shall Lead Us. INSB #0-9728156-1-9, First Edition both published by Green Mansions Inc. P O Box 100, Redmond, OR 97756.

References

(1) Guinness Book of World Records 2014 page 231
(2) 
(3) 
(4) 
(5) 
(6) 
(7) 
(8) Marquis "Who's Who in Frontiers of Science and Technology" 2nd Ed. 1985 page 226.
(9) Marquis "Who's Who in Science and Engineering 2000-2001 page 573.

External links

1930 births
20th-century American physicists
21st-century American physicists
Adelphi University alumni
Case Western Reserve University alumni
Living people
People from Woodmere, New York
Scientists from New York (state)
United States Navy personnel of the Korean War